Laila Friis-Salling (born April 11, 1985) is a freestyle skier from Greenland. She represented Denmark at the 2018 Winter Olympics in the women's halfpipe event.
In her runs in the Olympics, she fell twice.

References 

1985 births
Living people
Greenlandic people of Danish descent
Danish female freestyle skiers
Greenlandic female freestyle skiers
Freestyle skiers at the 2018 Winter Olympics
Olympic freestyle skiers of Denmark